Korrigan may refer to:

Korrigan, a fairy or dwarf-like spirit in Breton folkloric heritage
Malo Korrigan, full English title Malo Korrigan and the Space Tracers, French title Malo Korrigan et les Traceurs de L'Espace, French animated television series

See also
Corrigan (disambiguation)
Corrigan (surname)
Currigan